The yellowfin fairy-wrasse (Cirrhilabrus flavidorsalis) is a species of wrasse native to the western Pacific Ocean from Indonesia to the Philippines and Palau. It inhabits coral reefs, living in groups among the branches of branching coral.

References

External links
 

Yellowfin fairy-wrasse
Taxa named by John Ernest Randall
Fish described in 1980